Charif (Arabic: شريف) is both a surname and a given name and can be spelled either "Charif" or "Sharif". Notable people with the name include:

Gustavo Charif (born 1966), Argentine artist
Maher Charif, Palestinian Marxist historian
Moeen Charif (born 1972), Lebanese singer
Omar Sharif (1932-2015), Egyptian-American Hollywood actor
Charif Souki (born 1953), Egyptian-born American businessman